Chief Crazy Horse is a 1955 American CinemaScope Western film directed by George Sherman and starring Victor Mature, Suzan Ball and John Lund. The film is a fictionalized biography of the Lakota Sioux Chief Crazy Horse. It was also known as Valley of Fury.

Plot
When young Crazy Horse (Victor Mature) wins his bride, rival Little Big Man (Ray Danton) goes to villainous traders with evidence of gold in the sacred Lakota burial ground. A new gold rush starts and old treaties are torn up. Crazy Horse becomes chief of his people, leading them to war at the Battle of the Little Bighorn.

Cast
 Victor Mature as Crazy Horse
 Suzan Ball as Black Shawl
 John Lund as Major Twist
 Ray Danton as Little Big Man
 Keith Larsen as Flying Hawk
 Paul Guilfoyle as Worm
 David Janssen as Lt. Colin Cartwright
 Robert Warwick as Spotted Tail
 James Millican as General Crook
 Morris Ankrum as Red Cloud
 Donald Randolph as Aaron Cartwright
 Robert F. Simon as Jeff Mantz
 James Westerfield as Caleb Mantz
 Stuart Randall as Old Man Afraid
 Pat Hogan as Dull Knife
 Dennis Weaver as Maj. Carlisle
 John Peters as Sgt. Guthrie
 Henry Wills as He Dog

Production
Jeff Chandler was originally announced to play the lead. Instead the part was given to Victor Mature. Filming began in June 1954, on location in Montana and Wyoming. This was the final film of Suzan Ball who died of cancer four months after the film was released.

Reception 
Bosley Crowther wrote that the film was "just a series of hit-and-holler clashes between the Indians and the United States Cavalry" and "[s]o monotonous, indeed, are these forays that when they finally get around to the famous slaughter of Custer's troop at the Little Big Horn it is just another routine episode--even though it is later mentioned as the great victory that the old chief prophesied".

See also
List of American films of 1955

References

External links
 
 
 

1955 films
1950s English-language films
Universal Pictures films
1950s biographical films
1955 Western (genre) films
Films directed by George Sherman
American Western (genre) films
CinemaScope films
Films about Native Americans
Films set in 1876
Films scored by Frank Skinner
Films shot in Montana
Films shot in Wyoming
1950s American films